Big Valley is a small unincorporated community in Lassen County, California. As of July, 2007, its population is 1600.

History
This town came to being due to the California Gold Rush. A post office operated at Big Valley from 1873 to 1875 and from 1876 to 1877. A newspaper, the Big Valley Gazette was printed from 1893 through 1956. The name historically refers to the geographic valley between the ranges which is drained by Pit River and Ash Creek.

References

Unincorporated communities in California
Unincorporated communities in Lassen County, California